The Women's individual compound open was one of the events held in archery at the 2008 Summer Paralympics in Beijing.

The competition began with a ranking round, to determine the pairings in the next stage. Britain's Danielle Brown ranked first, setting a world record with 676 points, and was consequently paired against China's Wang Li, who ranked lowest with 551 points. Sweden's Zandra Reppe, second with 658 points was paired against Japan's Chieko Kamiya, seventh with 627 points. Turkey's Gülbin Su (650) was paired against Sweden's Ann-Christin Nilsson (641), while Britain's Melanie Clarke (647) and Pippa Britton (643) were paired against each other.

In the quarter-finals, the highest ranked archer defeated her opponent in three of the pairs. Brown defeated Wang 107:81; Clarke beat  Britton 110:106; and Su beat Nilsson 112:102. But Kamiya narrowly defeated Reppe 107:106 to advance to the semi-finals.

In the semis, Clarke again found herself against a fellow Briton, Brown, who set a Paralympic record by defeating her 113:107. In the other semi-final, Kamiya again advanced by a very narrow margin, beating Su 106:104. Clarke then won the bronze medal match by beating Su 113:109.

In the final, Danielle Brown took the gold medal, defeating Chieko Kamiya with the convincing score of 112:98. It was Brown's first participation in the Paralympic Games, at the age of 22; she later qualified to compete for England in the able-bodied archery competition at the 2010 Commonwealth Games.

Ranking Round

Competition bracket

References 

W
2008 in women's archery